The South West District Football League was a major Australian rules football competition which ran from 1910 until 1981 in the Riverina region of New South Wales.

History
The first recorded Australian Rules Football match in the Riverina area was on the 1st August, 1881 between Wagga Wagga and the more experienced Albury team and was played in Wagga.

The South West District Football Association (SWDFL) was formed in 1913, when it superseded the Ganmain Football Association, which was formed in 1910, with all clubs moving into play in the SWDFL competition.

In 1924 a South Western District Football League team played Collingwood Football Club at Narrandera with Collingwood winning, 86 to SWDFL 76.

In May, 1930 the SWDFL competition was abandoned, after Whitton withdrew earlier at the AGM, then both Ganmain and Matong club withdrew due to a lack of players.

In the 1931 SWDFL grand final, Jim Ceely, from Matong FC received a trophy for best player on the ground.

In August 1933, Melbourne Football Club played a match at Narandrea Park Oval against a SWDFL representative team, with Melbourne: 15.19 - 109 defeating SWDFL: 8.20 - 68.

In 1934, a SWDFL representative team played a match at Leeton against a combined Hawthorn - Footscray team, with Hawthorn - Footscray: 20.15 - 135 defeating the SWDFL: 6.11 - 47.

In 1937 and 1938, both Ganmain & Matong football clubs pulled out of the SWDFL and thus the SWDFL went into recess.

In April, 1939, the SWDFL was reformed with the following seven club's taking part - Coolamon, Ganmain, Griffith, Grong Grong, Leeton, Matong and Narandera.

Laurie Taylor and Dudley Smith from Coolamon FC, played for New South Wales against Victoria in July, 1949, at the Sydney Cricket Ground.

In 1953, Ariah Park FC and Mirrool FC merged and entered one senior team & one reserves team in the SWDFL.

Ardlethan FC joined the SWDFL in 1954 and wore a jumper featuring three vertical stripes, black, gold and red.

In 1959, former Brownlow Medalist, Grong Grong Matong captain-coach, Peter Box wins the Gammage Medal, but SWDFL officials later decide that coaches would be ineligile to win the league award in future years.

The SWDFL first played in the Victorian Country Football League in 1961 and in 1964, won the Victorian Country Football Championships, with SWDFL: 13.14 - 92 defeating the Hampden Football League: 9.16 - 70 in the grand final, played at Narrandera.

Mr. Jim Quinn was President of the South Western District Football League for 25 consecutive years, before resigning on Monday 5 April 1976 due to ill health.

In 1969, Ricky Quade and Frank Gumbleton, both finished third in the SWDFL best and fairest award, the Gammage Medal, with both going on to have fine VFL careers.

The league was forced to merge with the Central Riverina Football League and the Farrer Football League to form the Riverina Football League and Riverina District Football League in 1982, under the recommendations from the VCFL, with the CRDFL changing its name to the Farrer Football League in 1985.

It was between 1983 and 1994 that the Riverina District Football League / Farrer Football League maintained a two division system.

Clubs

Football Premierships
In 1931, the Page Final Four System was introduced by the VFL.                 
Seniors

Football Best and Fairest Award
Seniors
WIlliam Gammage Medal (William J. Gammage was the Treasurer of the SWDFL who first donated the medal in 1948)

Leading Goalkicker
Seniors
Keisling Trophy Was donated by Mr. Ken Keisling, from E & K Keisling Jewellers, Narrandera.

Interleague Football Results
The Neville Nesbitt Trophy
Neville Nesbitt was the donor of a large trophy for interleague matches between the SWDFL and the Farrer Football League.

The SWDFL first played in the Victorian Country Football League inter-league competition in 1961 and in 1964, won the Victorian Country Football Champions, with SWDFL: 13.14 - 92 defeating the Hampden Football League: 9.16 - 70 in the grand final, played at Narrandera.

The SWDFL won the 1977 NSW Country Championships, defeating the Murray Football League in Sydney and the 1979 NSW Country Championships, defeating the Sydney Football League, which was played at Narrandera.

VFL Players
The following SWDFL footballers went onto play senior VFL football with the following clubs, with the year indicating their VFL debut - 

 1925 - Joseph Plant - Narrandera to Richmond
 1925 - Les Stainsby - Coolamon to Collingwood
 1928 - Jack Haw - Leeton to Melbourne
 1931 - Geoff Neil - Leeton to St. Kilda
 1933 - George Schlitz - Leeton to St. Kilda
 1934 - George Pattison - Narrandera to Essendon
 1936 - Percy Bushby - Narrandrea to Essendon
 1948 - Laurie Carroll - Ganmain to St. Kilda
 1948 - Dudley Mattingly - Ganmain to St. Kilda
 1955 - Peter Curtis - Coolamon, Griffith to North Melbourne
 1957 - Tom Quade - Ariah Park Mirrool to North Melbourne
 1958 - Bill Box - Whitton to Essendon
 1960 - Des Lyons - Leeton to Carlton
 1961 - Jim Carroll - Ganmain to Carlton
 1961 - Tom Carroll - Ganmain to Carlton
 1966 - Mike Quade - Ariah Park Mirrool to North Melbourne
 1968 - Ross Elwin - Leeton to South Melbourne
 1968 - Bruce Reid - Leeton to South Melbourne

 1970 - Frank Gumbleton - Ganmain to North Melbourne
 1970 - Ricky Quade - Ariah Park Mirrool to South Melbourne
 1971 - Jim Prentice - Ariah Park Mirrool to South Melbourne
 1975 - Rod Coelli - Ardlethan to South Melbourne
 1975 - Terry O'Neil - Narrandera to South Melbourne
 1976 - Terry Daniher - Ariah Park - Mirrool to South Melbourne
 1977 - Wayne Evans - Grong Grong Matong to South Melbourne
 1978 - Russell Campbell - Gainmain to South Melbourne
 1979 - Wayne Carroll - Ganmain to South Melbourne
 1979 - John Durnan - Narrandera to Geelong
 1979 - Mark Fraser - Turvey Park to South Melbourne
 1979 - Max Kruse - Leeton to South Melbourne
 1980 - Stephen Eather - Turvey Park to South Melbourne
 1980 - Victor Hugo - Narrandera to South Melbourne
1980 - Greg Smith - Ardlethan to South Melbourne
 1981 - Dennis Carroll - Ganmain to South Melbourne
 1981 - Anthony Daniher - Turvey Park to South Melbourne
 1981 - Jack Lucas - Ariah Park - Mirrool to South Melbourne

The following senior VFL players came to play and or coach in the SWDFL, with the year indicating their first season in the SWDFL.

 
1914 - Charles Pickerd - St. Kilda to Narrandera
1923 - Jock Doherty - St. Kilda to Ganmain
1934 - Maurie Mahony - Hawthorn to Coolamon
1934 - Leo Nolan - Melbourne to Leeton
1934 - Keith Parris - Essendon to Narrandera
1935 - Jerry McAuliffe - Hawthorn to Leeton
1937 - Roy McEachen - South Melbourne to Narrandera
1940 - Norm Le Brun - Essendon to Ganmain
1947 - Jim Hallahan - Fitzroy to Coolamon
1947 - Les Meek - St. Kilda to Ganmain
1947 - Geoff Willis - North Melbourne to Griffith
1948 - Tom Bush - Melbourne to Coolamon
1948 - Les Main - Collingwood to Leeton
1949 - Kevin Kallady - St. Kilda to Narrandera
1950 - Frank Bourke - Richmond to Ganmain
1950 - George Bennett - Hawthorn to Matong
1950 - Keith Shea - Carlton to Griffith
1950 - Tom Spear - Hawthorn to Matong
1951 - Laurie Taylor - Richmond to Coolamon
1952 - Clinton Wines - Carlton to Ganmain
1952 - Tom Roulent - South Melbourne to Griffith
1953 - Dean Chapman - St. Kilda to Coolamon
1953 - Erwin Dornau - South Melbourne to Leeton
1956 - Mick Grambeau - North Melbourne to Ganmain
1957 - Tom Allen - Richmond to Griffith
1958 - Kevin Gleeson - Richmond to Ganmain
1959 - Peter Box - Footscray to Grong Grong Matong
1959 - Fred Gallagher - Essendon to Turvey Park

1959 - Ian Gillett - South Melbourne to Coolamon
1959 - Don Keyter - South Melbourne to Griffith
1960 - Bill Byrne - Melbourne to Leeton
1962 - Gerald Eastmure - North Melbourne to Leeton
1963 - Fred Mundy - Richmond to Griffith
1964 - Bill Evely - Richmond to Whitton
1964 - Peter Morris - Richmond to Griffith
1964 - Peter Weidemann - Collingwood to Coolamon
1965 - Noel Anderson - Richmond to Whitton
1965 - Barry Connolly - Footscray to Ardlethan
1965 - Ray Dawson - Melbourne to Leeton
1965 - Jim Gutterson - Footscray to Turvey Park
1965 - Kevin Kirkpatrick - Geelong to Griffith
1965 - Barry Rist - Collingwood to Ariah Park - Mirrool
1965 - Bill Thripp - Collingwood to Ardlethan
1966 - Frank Hodgkin - St. Kilda to Ganmain
1967 - Ron Harvey - Fitzroy to Coolamon
1968 - Vern Drake - Fitzroy to Ariah Park - Mirrool
1968 - Barney McKellar - Footscray to Coolamon
1969 - Graham Ion - Footscray to Turvey Park
1970 - Doug Priest - South Melbourne to Ariah Park - Mirrool
1970 - Warren Roper - Collingwood to Narrandera
1971 - Kevin Delmenico - Footscray to Ganmain
1972 - Phil Gehrig - Footscray to Ganmain
1976 - Keith Miller - Geelong to Turvey Park
1979 - Harry Skreja - Footscray to Leeton
1980 - Kevin Grose - Collingwood to Ardlethan
1981 - Brian Symes - North Melbourne to Ganmain

South Australian National Football League
1961 - Geoff Kingston - Turvey Park to West Torrens

Officer Bearers

Life Members
1972 - Jim Quinn

Links
History of South West District Football League
"Swans on Screen": Griffith FNC - Detailed & comprehensive club & SWDFL league history
AFL Victoria Country
Australian rules football in New South Wales
Albury & District Football League
Central Hume Football Association
Central Riverina Football League
Central Riverina FL - "CRFL Weekly Record"
Coreen & District Football League
Farrer Football League
Hume Football Netball League
Northern Riverina Football League
Riverina Football Association
Riverina Football Netball League
1928 - South West DFL Premiers: Narrandera FC team photo
1948 - South West DFL Premiers: Narrandera FC team photo
1962 - South West DFL Premiers: Ariah Park FC team photo
1964 - Victorian Country Football Champions: SWDFL Representative team photo
1974 - South West DFL Premiers: Narransdera FC team photo

References

Defunct Australian rules football competitions in New South Wales
Sport in the Riverina
Sports leagues established in 1949
1949 establishments in Australia
1981 disestablishments in Australia